Ollanta is a genus of cicadas in the family Cicadidae. There are at least four described species in Ollanta.

Species
These four species belong to the genus Ollanta:
 Ollanta caicosensis Davis, 1939 i c g
 Ollanta melvini Ramos, 1983 i c g
 Ollanta mexicana Distant, 1905 i c g
 Ollanta modesta (Distant, 1881) i c g
Data sources: i = ITIS, c = Catalogue of Life, g = GBIF, b = Bugguide.net

References

Further reading

 
 
 
 
 
 

Fidicinini
Cicadidae genera